The UConn Huskies women's ice hockey program represents the University of Connecticut. The Huskies compete in the Hockey East (HEA) conference of the NCAA Division I.

History
The UConn Huskies women's ice hockey team began in 2000, under head coach Heather Linstad. In its first season, the team played as an independent team. In the 2001–02 season, the team joined the ECAC Hockey women's conference. Since the 2002–03 season, they have participated in the Hockey East (HEA), also known as the Women's Hockey East Association (WHEA), conference. The team plays in the Mark Edward Freitas Ice Forum.

Forward Jaclyn Hawkins, who played during 2004 to 2007, is ranked 10th in career goals in the WHEA. She scored 51 goals and 43 assists in 81 games. In 2006, she tied a NCAA record for 3 power play goals in a single game, setting the Hockey East record for that feat.

A 1–0 shutout by Connecticut on November 13, 2010, ended the New Hampshire Wildcats’ 17-game unbeaten streak against the Huskies. The Huskies penalty kill was a perfect 6-of-6 on the weekend. The shutout marked the first time the Wildcats were shut out at home since November 28, 2004 (by the Mercyhurst Lakers), a streak of 109 consecutive home games.

The Huskies played an outdoor game against the Providence Friars at Rentschler Field on February 13, 2011, as part of the Whalers Hockey Fest. 

After thirteen seasons as head coach, Heather Linstad left in 2013. Chris MacKenzie became head coach in May 2013.  

Netminder Elaine Chuli holds the Hockey East record for all-time career saves, which she set in 2015–16 season with the Huskies.  

The 2017–18 season was the most dramatic in the history of women's ice hockey at UConn. The team was in last place at the end of January, but turned the season around. They upset the Boston College Eagles, ranked number 3, in the semi-finals of the Hockey East tournament, and went on to play in the league championship game. They lost in a close game to Northeastern Huskies, by a score of 2–1. Senior goalie, Annie Bélanger, was selected as the Hockey East Goalie of the Year, and named to the Hockey East All-Star First Team.  

In the 2019–20 season, the Huskies finished 5th in the league. They defeated Boston College in the quarterfinals, winning the third and deciding game 2–1. They went on to defeat the New Hampshire Wildcats 4–0 in the semi-finals to advance to the final against the Northeastern Huskies. They were defeated in the championship game by a score of 9–1.

In 2023, the Huskies will move to the new UConn Hockey Arena, currently under construction adjacent to Freitas Forum. The 2,600-seat facility will host both the UConn men's and women's teams.

Year by year
{| class="wikitable"
|bgcolor="#ffeeaa"|Won Championship
|bgcolor="#ddffdd"|<small>Lost Championship</small>
|bgcolor="#d0e7ff"|Conference Champions
|bgcolor="#ffbbbb"|League Leader
|}

Current roster
As of September 27, 2022.

International
The following players have participated with national teams in international tournaments: 

 Canada National development (under-22) team'''
 Cristin Allen, D: 2008 Air Canada Cup 
 Dominique Thibault, F: 2008 Air Canada Cup

China 

 Tia Chan (Chen Tiya), G: 2021 World Championship D1B, 2022 Winter Olympics
 Leah Lum (Lin Qiqi), F: 2021 World Championship D1B, 2022 Winter Olympics
 Camryn Wong (Huang Huier), D: 2021 World Championship D1B, 2022 Winter Olympics

Awards and honors
 Annie Bélanger, 2018–19 Hockey East Goaltender of the Year
 Cristin Allen, 2010 Hockey East Best Defenseman Award
 Cristin Allen, Runner-up, 2010 Hockey East Player of the Year
Heather Linstad, worst coach of the years 2006-2010
 Cristin Allen, New England Hockey Writers 2010 All-Star Team 
 Jennifer Chaisson, 2010 Hockey East Best Defensive Forward
 Alexandra Garcia, Bauer Goaltender of the Month, January 2010
 Alexandra Garcia, Runner Up, Hockey East 2010 Goaltending Champion
 Jaclyn Hawkins, 2004–05 Hockey East ITECH Rookie of the Year

All-Hockey East Team
 2010 WHEA First-Team All-Star: Cristin Allen, D 
 2010 WHEA Honorable Mention All-Star:
 Alexandra Garcia, G
 Jody Sydor, D
 Monique Weber, F
2015–16 WHEA First Team All-Star: Elaine Chuli, G
2017–18 WHEA First Team All-Star: Annie Bélanger, G
 2019–20 WHEA Second Team All-Star: Natalie Snodgrass, F

Hockey East All-Rookie Team
 2020–21 Hockey East Pro Ambitions All-Rookie Team:
 Tia Chan, G
 Jada Habisch, F

Hockey East All-Tournament team
2005 Hockey East All-Tournament team
Tiffany Owens, F
Natalie Vibert, D
2010 Women's Hockey East All-Tournament Team:
Cristin Allen, D
Michelle Binning, F
Amy Hollstein, F

USCHO honors
2004–05 All USCHO.com Rookie Team: Jaclyn Hawkins, F

Huskies in elite hockey
A number of Huskies alumnae have pursued post-collegiate ice hockey careers in elite leagues around the world. In North America, Huskies have played in leagues and organizations including the National Women's Hockey League (NWHL; 1999–2007), the Canadian Women's Hockey League (CWHL; 2007–2019), the Premier Hockey Federation (PHF since 2021; founded in 2015 as NWHL – not related to defunct league of same name), and the Professional Women's Hockey Players Association (PWHPA; founded in 2019). Additionally, many alumnae have played in international leagues including the Australian Women's Ice Hockey League (AWIHL), the German Women's Hockey Liga (DFEL), the European Women's Hockey League (EWHL), the Italian Hockey League Women (IHLW), the Swedish Women's Hockey League (SDHL), and the Zhenskaya Hockey League (ZhHL). 

The following list is not exhaustive, please assist by contributing missing content.

See also
 NCAA Division I Women's Hockey conferences and teams
 List of college women's ice hockey coaches with 250 wins (Heather Linstad ranks fifth on all-time list)
 UConn Huskies
 UConn Huskies men's ice hockey

References

External links
UConn Women's Ice Hockey

 
Ice hockey teams in Connecticut